"The Silence" is episode 61 of the American television anthology series The Twilight Zone.  The plot of this episode was based in part on the short story "The Bet" by Anton Chekhov.  It originally aired on April 28, 1961 on CBS. It is one of the few Twilight Zone episodes to feature no supernatural or sci-fi elements.

Opening narration

Plot
Colonel Archie Taylor, a gruff aristocrat, has difficulty enjoying his men's club because of the constant chatter of fellow member Jamie Tennyson. In an effort to shut Tennyson up, Taylor bets him $500,000 that he cannot remain silent for one year. If Tennyson accepts the wager, a small glass-walled apartment will be erected in the club's game room where he will be monitored by microphones so that he cannot speak without detection. He may only write notes to communicate, and the other members may observe him through the glass.

Tennyson is offended but agrees, needing the money to pay the debts incurred by his wife's exorbitant spending. He proposes that Taylor put a check on deposit in his name, but the club members reject this request as Taylor has a strong standing of honor and credit. "My [Tennyson's] courage against your [Taylor's] credit" is accepted by both, and the challenge begins at 10:00 the following night.

Taylor initially expects to win within a few weeks, but Tennyson surprises him by remaining silent for nine months. Taylor gets nervous and offers Tennyson first $5,000 and then $6,000 to call off the bet. He begins suggesting that Tennyson's wife is planning to leave him for another man. She has never responded to any of Tennyson's several written requests for a visit, giving weight to Taylor's insinuations. Tennyson seems gripped by despair at the thought of losing his wife, but nonetheless refuses to call off the bet.

On the last evening of the year, club member Alfred tells Taylor his behavior over the past months, particularly using Tennyson's wife as a threat, has severely damaged the club's esteem for him. As the clock chimes to officially signal that the one year has passed, Tennyson emerges to the congratulations of his fellow club members before he approaches Taylor and silently puts his hand out for the money. The embarrassed Taylor admits that he had lost his fortune several years earlier. He praises Tennyson's resolve and character and then announces his decision to resign from the club.

The distraught Tennyson scribbles furiously on a sheet of paper, perplexing the other men who wonder why he does not speak aloud. Taylor reads the note aloud: "I knew I would not be able to keep my part of the bargain, so one year ago I had the nerves to my vocal cords severed." Tennyson displays the scar on his throat from the operation, which he has concealed for the past twelve months under scarves and turtlenecks.

Closing narration

References

Sources
Zicree, Marc Scott. The Twilight Zone Companion. Sillman-James Press, 1982 (second edition).
DeVoe, Bill. (2008). Trivia from The Twilight Zone. Albany, GA: Bear Manor Media. 
Grams, Martin. (2008). The Twilight Zone: Unlocking the Door to a Television Classic. Churchville, MD: OTR Publishing.

External links

1961 American television episodes
The Twilight Zone (1959 TV series season 2) episodes
Television episodes written by Rod Serling
Fiction set in 1961
Fiction set in 1962